Bradley Donn Sellers (born December 17, 1962) is an American retired basketball player, politician, and radio broadcaster.

As a basketball player, Sellers played collegiately from 1981-1986 first at Wisconsin before transferring to Ohio State. He then professionally for several teams in the National Basketball Association (NBA) from 1986-1994, before going overseas to play for various international teams until retiring in 1999.  

As a politician, he is currently serving in his third term as the mayor of his hometown, Warrensville Heights, Ohio.  

As a broadcaster, he serves as a postgame radio analyst for the Cleveland Cavaliers AudioVerse (radio network) - a job he has held for over a decade.

Professional career
A 7'0" power forward/center from the University of Wisconsin and Ohio State University, he was selected by the Chicago Bulls in the first round (ninth pick overall) of the 1986 NBA draft.

Sellers was a controversial selection among the Bulls' staff and players. General manager Jerry Krause was attracted to Sellers because of his above-average shooting ability, which was rare in a player of Sellers's size. Michael Jordan and others, however, had wanted Krause to draft Johnny Dawkins, a hard-playing guard from Duke University and a friend of Jordan's.

Sellers eventually became a part-time starter for Chicago, but he never averaged more than 9.5 points or 4.7 rebounds in a season, and, with the emergence of forward Horace Grant during the 1988 NBA playoffs, he began to see his playing time diminish. In 1989, he was traded to the Seattle SuperSonics for the 18th overall pick of that year's NBA draft, which would become point guard B. J. Armstrong. He played sparingly for the Sonics, averaging 4.8 points in 13.0 minutes in 45 before being traded to the Minnesota Timberwolves for Steve Johnson on February 22, 1990, where he finished out the season.

The following season, Sellers played for Aris B.C. in the Greek Basketball League. At the Greek Championships Final in 1991, Sellers made a three-point play (a basket and a foul) that won the game and gave Aris the championship.

Following his stay in Greece, Sellers returned to the NBA and played for the Detroit Pistons and the Timberwolves the next two seasons. From 1993 to 1999, Sellers played in Spain, Israel and France before retiring in 2000 to become community liaison director for his hometown, Warrensville Heights, Ohio.

After basketball
Since the 2010-2011 NBA season, Sellers has been a media personality in Cleveland, Ohio as the postgame analyst for Cleveland Cavaliers radio broadcasts.

Sellers was elected mayor of his native Warrensville Heights on November 8, 2011, and sworn in on January 1, 2012. He was re-elected on November 3, 2015 and again in November 2019. Sellers is a member of the Democratic Party.

References

External links
Career stats at basketball-reference.com
A March 2, 2001 article about Brad Sellers
basketpedya.com
NYT article on political ambitions

1962 births
Living people
African-American basketball players
African-American mayors in Ohio
American athlete-politicians
American expatriate basketball people in France
American expatriate basketball people in Greece
American expatriate basketball people in Israel
American expatriate basketball people in Spain
American men's basketball players
Aris B.C. players
Basketball players from Ohio
Centers (basketball)
Chicago Bulls draft picks
Chicago Bulls players
Detroit Pistons players
Gijón Baloncesto players
HTV Basket players
Liga ACB players
Maccabi Rishon LeZion basketball players
Mayors of places in Ohio
Montpellier Paillade Basket players
Minnesota Timberwolves players
Ohio State Buckeyes men's basketball players
Olympique Antibes basketball players
Paris Racing Basket players
People from Warrensville Heights, Ohio
Power forwards (basketball)
Seattle SuperSonics players
Sportspeople from Cuyahoga County, Ohio
Wisconsin Badgers men's basketball players
Ohio Democrats
21st-century African-American people
20th-century African-American sportspeople